Hemmingford is a village municipality located in Les Jardins-de-Napierville Regional County Municipality of southern Quebec. The population as of 2021 was 829.

It was founded in 1878 by the division of the Township of Hemmingford creating two separate entities: the Township and the Village of Hemmingford. Both municipalities are locally referred to collectively as Hemmingford. The two share many things, such as the cost of the volunteer fire department and both hold their councils and offices in the same building in the village.

The village of Hemmingford is surrounded by the Township of Hemmingford. The centre of the village is at the intersection of Route 219 and Route 202.

The postal code for both the town and village of Hemmingford is J0L 1H0.

Demographics 

See also
Les Jardins-de-Napierville Regional County Municipality
English River (Chateauguay River tributary)
List of village municipalities in Quebec
Township of Hemmingford
Hemingford, Nebraska

References

External links
 Hemmingford Village and Township website
 The Gleaner/La Source (local English/French newspaper)
Statistics Canada 2011 census results for Hemmingford (village)
Epodunk Canada search results for Hemmingford
Google map of the village of Hemmingford

Villages in Quebec
Incorporated places in Les Jardins-de-Napierville Regional County Municipality